The Damstraat is a street in Haarlem, connecting the Spaarne river to the  "Lange Veerstraat", "Klokhuisplein" and the "Oude Groenmarkt" behind the St. Bavochurch.

The street is lined with rijksmonuments, most notably the Waag, a former weighing house and landmark on the Spaarne, and the fundatiehuis, former home of Pieter Teyler van der Hulst and front door of the museum founded in his name from 1778 until 1865. The new Haarlem court of Justice is also in this street, located in a modern building called the Appelaar, which is constructed on the spot where the Joh. Enschedé printing company resided for three centuries. Under the Damstraat a large parking garage was realized during the construction of the Appelaar in the 1990s.

References

 website Gemeente Haarlem
 website for the Waag

Streets in Haarlem